The Liberal Socialist Party is a political party in Angola. It was founded on February 16, 1993. The party is a member of the coalition New Democracy. The party was previously a member of the coalition Parties of the Civilian Opposition, but pulled out of it and took part in founding New Democracy in December 2006.

Notes

Socialist parties in Angola
Political parties established in 1993
1993 establishments in Angola
Political parties in Angola
Liberal socialism